Dean Mitchell, better known by his stage name Saxsquatch, is an American musician notable for wearing a Bigfoot costume and playing cover versions of popular songs on the saxophone. Mitchell is the former saxophonist for The Marcus King Band. He gained notoriety for a number of viral videos and has amassed a large social media following.

Career
Saxsquatch began uploading his performances to YouTube in 2019 and gained viral notoriety with his cover of One More Time by Daft Punk. His cover of You Don't Know Me was featured on Tosh.0. By September 2020, he averaged 3–5 million views per day on social media and became one the top solo artists on the Pollstar livestream charts. His music has been described as "a full-on mash-up of live instrumental saxophone, upright bass, and funky electronic beats."

In October 2020, Saxsquatch commenced the Saxual Healing Tour 2020, which featured outdoor concerts at multiple venues. By early 2021, his "Live From The Woods" performances became Facebook's top recurring music stream. In 2021, Saxsquatch and John Oates collaborated to create an electronic dance music cover of the Hall & Oates' 1982 song Maneater. The duo live streamed the song together on March 20, 2021. Saxsquatch and Half an Orange collaborated and released the single Moondance, which was featured in the videogame Rocket League in 2021.

On January 31, 2022, Saxsquatch appeared on episode six of That's My Jam hosted by comedian Jimmy Fallon.

References

Living people
Musicians from North Carolina
People from Chapel Hill, North Carolina
American male saxophonists
American male jazz musicians
21st-century American saxophonists
Bigfoot
Year of birth missing (living people)